Dieter Enders (17 March 1946 – 29 June 2019) was a German organic chemist who did work developing asymmetric synthesis, in particular using modified prolines as chiral auxiliaries. The most widely applied of his chiral auxiliaries are the complementary SAMP and RAMP auxiliaries, which allow for asymmetric alpha-alkylation of aldehydes and ketones. In 1974 he obtained his doctorate from the University of Gießen studying under Dieter Seebach and followed this with a postdoc at Harvard University studying with Elias James Corey. He then moved back to Gießen to obtain his Habilitation in 1979, whereupon he became a lecturer, soon obtaining Professorship in 1980 as Professor of Organic Chemistry at Bonn. In 1985 he moved to Aachen, where he was Full Professor of Organic Chemistry and Director. He was editor-in-chief of Synthesis and was on the advisory boards of many other journals including Letters in Organic Chemistry and SynLett.

During his career he won many awards, including:

 1993 Gottfried Wilhelm Leibniz Prize of the Deutsche Forschungsgemeinschaft
 1995 Yamada Award, Japan
 2000 Max-Planck-Forschungspreis for Chemistry
 2002 Emil-Fischer-Medaille of the GDCh
 2014 Ryoji Noyori Prize, Japan

External links 

 Dieter Enders Home Page 
 Curriculum Vitae Prof. Dr. Dieter Enders 

1946 births
2019 deaths
University of Giessen alumni
Harvard University alumni
Academic staff of the University of Bonn
20th-century German chemists
Gottfried Wilhelm Leibniz Prize winners
Academic staff of RWTH Aachen University
Organic chemists
21st-century German chemists